Youth literature may refer to:

 Young adult literature
 Children's literature